Jean Absil (23 October 1893 – 2 February 1974) was a Belgian composer, organist, and professor at the Brussels Conservatoire.

Biography
Absil was born in Bonsecours, Hainaut, Belgium. His teacher there was Alphonse Oeyen, organist at the basilica of Bonsecours. From 1913 he studied organ and harmony at the Brussels Conservatoire, but upon graduating, decided to concentrate on composition instead.

In 1922 Absil won the Belgian Prix de Rome and in 1934 the Prix Rubens, which allowed him to travel to Paris. Here, he met fellow contemporary composers Ibert, Milhaud, and Honegger. Absil gained international prominence with the premiere of his first piano concerto (op. 30), composed for the 1938 Queen Elizabeth Competition for Piano (Ysaye), for which it was the compulsory piece for all finalists. Only one of those, Moura Lympany, who won second prize (after Emil Gilels), performed the piece entirely from memory mistake free.

From 1930 onwards, Absil taught harmony at the Brussels Conservatoire, becoming a professor of counterpoint there six years later. Amongst his Conservatoire pupils was Paul Danblon. He also taught at Chapelle Musicale Reine Elisabeth and the Etterbeek Music School. During this period also, he was, with Charles Leirens, the first editor of the Revue Internationale de Musique (1936–1952). From 1955 he served as a member of Belgium's Royal Academy. He died in Brussels at the age of 80.

Compositions

Initially, Absil was influenced by the late Romantic school, particularly Wagner and Richard Strauss. Around the time he made his trip to Paris in 1934, he began to adopt a more modern style. This included the use of polyphony and polymodal structures, influenced by contemporary composers such as Milhaud and Schoenberg.

The ear never suffers from an impression of tonal insecurity when listening to Absil's music: while it is no longer possible to find a reference to the classical major or minor tonalities, the composer invents new modes, which he replaces for each piece. From these modes emerge chords which, even if they are different from the classical ones, also have an expressive sense (tension or resolution). Absil never practised a real atonality: the apparent tonal independence of the voices always resolves itself into a unique tonality.

Unusually prolific from his 20s to his late 70s, Absil concentrated especially on writing piano works; he was himself a skilled pianist. These works include Ballade, op. 129, for solo piano (which is played with the left hand only) as well as 3 Pièces (played with the right one only). Among his conventionally two-handed piano compositions are three sonatinas (written in 1937, 1939, and 1965 respectively) and two Grand Suites. The Grand Suites (Op.110, composed in 1965) served as a tribute to Frédéric Chopin. In 1946, he composed another work, Hommage à Schumann and in 1957 the Passacaglia in Memoriam Alban Berg, both of them for piano. His last finished composition was the Piano Concerto no. 3, op. 162.

Non-piano music of Absil's includes one opera, Les Voix de la mer, and a cycle of five symphonies, the first of which (op. 1) he composed at 27, when he was a pupil of Paul Gilson. It won the Prix Agniez in 1921.

List of works (alphabetical)
Based on the list of scores available at the Belgian Documentation Centre for Contemporary Music:

 A cloche-pied op. 139 – 1968, for children's voice and piano
 Alcools op. 43 – 1940, for 4 mixed voices a cappella
 Allegro brillante op. 132 – 1967, for 2 pianos
 Allegro brillante op. 132 – 1967, for piano and orchestra
 Alternances op. 140 – 1968, for piano
 Asymétries op. 136 – 1968, for 2 pianos
 Ballade op. 129 – 1966, for piano (left hand)
 Ballade op. 156 – 1971, for alto saxophone, piano and small orchestra
 Berceuse – 1932, for alto saxophone or viola or cello and small orchestra
 Berceuse – 1932, for cello or viola or alto saxophone and piano
 Bestiaire op. 58 – 1944, for mixed Choir a cappella
 Burlesque op. 100 – 1958, for oboe and piano
 Cache-cache op. 117 – 1963, for middle voice and piano
 Chaconne op. 69 – 1949, for violin
 Chanson de quatre sous – 1942, for middle voice and piano
 Chansons de bonne humeur op. 49 – 1942, for two-part women's choir (S.-Mz.) and orchestra
 Chansons de bonne humeur op. 49 – 1942, for two-part women's choir and piano
 Chansons plaisantes – 2e recueil op. 94 – 1956, for two-part children's choir and piano
 Chansons plaisantes op. 88 – 1955, for 2 children's voices
 Cimetière – 1927, for middle voice and piano
 Cinq bagatelles op. 61 – 1944, for piano
 Cinq chansons de Paul Fort op. 18 – 1935, for 2 equal voices and piano
 Cinq choeurs – 1930, for three-part women's choir and piano
 Cinq mélodies – 1927, for middle voice and piano
 Cinq mélodies op. 12 – 1933, for Mezzo-Soprano and string quartet
 Cinq pièces faciles op. 138 – 1968, for clarinet or alto saxophone and piano
 Colas Chacha – ?, for large orchestra
 Colindas op. 87 – 1955, for three-part choir a cappella
 Concert à cinq op. 38 – 1939, for flute, violin, viola, cello and diatonic harp
 Concertino op. 42 – 1940, for cello and orchestra
 Concertino op. 42 – 1940, for cello and piano
 Concertino op. 122 – 1964, for viola and piano
 Concertino op. 122 – 1964, for viola and string orchestra
 Concerto grosso op. 60 – 1944, for wind quintet and string orchestra
 Concerto n°2 op. 124 – 1964, for violin and orchestra
 Concerto n°2 op. 124 – 1964, for violin and piano
 Concerto n°2 op. 131 – 1967, for 2 pianos
 Concerto n°2 op. 131 – 1967, for piano and orchestra
 Concerto n°3 op. 162 – 1973, for 2 pianos
 Concerto n°3 op. 162 – 1973, for piano and orchestra
 Concerto op. 11 – 1933, for violin and orchestra
 Concerto op. 11 – 1933, for violin and piano
 Concerto op. 30 – 1937, for 2 pianos
 Concerto op. 30 – 1937, for piano and orchestra
 Concerto op. 54 – 1942, for viola and orchestra
 Concerto op. 54 – 1942, for viola and piano
 Concerto op. 155 – 1971, for guitar and small orchestra
 Contes op. 76 – 1951, for trumpet and piano
 Contrastes op. 143 – 1969, for 2 guitars
 Croquis pour un carnaval op. 137 – 1968, for clarinet quartet and diatonic harp
 Croquis sportifs op. 85 – 1954, for band
 Danses bulgares op. 103 – 1961, for band
 Danses bulgares op. 103 – 1959, for flute, oboe, clarinet, horn and bassoon
 Danses bulgares op. 103 – 1959, for piano
 De tijd – ?, for Children's choir and piano
 Déités op. 160 – 1972, for orchestra
 Deux danses rituelles op. 105 – 1960, for small orchestra
 Deux mélodies – 1933, for middle voice and piano
 Deux poèmes op. 53 – 1942, for Soprano and piano
 Divertimento op. 86 – 1955, for saxophone quartet and orchestra
 Du rythme à l'expression I op. 108 – 1961, for piano
 Du rythme à l'expression II op. 108 – 1961, for piano
 Echecs op. 96 – 1957, for piano
 Enfantines op. 52 – 1942, for middle voice and piano
 Epouvantail op. 74 – 1950, for orchestra
 Epouvantail op. 74 – 1950, for piano
 Esquisses sur les 7 péchés capitaux op. 83 – 1954, for piano
 Etude n°3 – 1963, for concert drum and piano
 Etude XI – ?, for 4 timpani and piano
 Etude XI – ?, for concert drum and piano
 Evasion op. 8 – 1927, for high voice and piano
 Fanfares op. 118 – 1963, for band
 Fantaisie – Caprice op. 152 – 1971, for alto saxophone and band
 Fantaisie – Caprice op. 152 – 1971, for saxophone and piano
 Fantaisie – Humoresque op. 113 – 1962, for clarinet and piano
 Fantaisie – Humoresque op. 113 – 1962, for clarinet and string orchestra
 Fantaisie concertante op. 99 – 1958, for violin and orchestra
 Fantaisie concertante op. 99 – 1958, for violin and piano
 Fantaisie rhapsodique op. 21 – 1936, for cello quartet
 Fantaisie op. 40 – 1939, for violin, viola, cello and piano
 Féeries op. 153 – 1971, for piano
 Grande suite n°2 op. 110 – 1962, for piano
 Grande suite op. 62 – 1944, for piano
 Heure de grâce op. 98 – 1958, for high voice and piano
 Hommage à Lekeu op. 35/bis – 1939, for orchestra
 Hommage à Schumann op. 67 – 1946, for piano
 Humoresques op. 126 – 1965, for piano
 Images stellaires op. 161 – 1973, for violin and cello
 Introduction et Valses op. 89 – 1955, for orchestra
 Jeanne d'Arc op. 65 – 1945, for orchestra
 L'album à colorier op. 68 – 1948, for two-part children's choir and piano
 La mort de Tintagiles op. 3 – 1926, for orchestra
 Le chant à l'école op. 144 – 1969, for Choir a cappella
 Le chapeau chinois (extr.) op. 64 – 1944, for Tenor and piano
 Le chapeau chinois op. 64 – 1944, for opera
 Le chapeau chinois op. 64 – 1944, for S. 2T. Bar. B. and piano
 Le cirque volant op. 82 – 1953, for choir (2 children's voices), Narrator and piano
 Le miracle de Pan op. 71 – 1949, for orchestra
 Le miracle de Pan op. 71 – 1949, for piano
 Le zodiaque op. 70 – 1949, for piano, choir (4 mixed voices), Soloists and orchestra
 Le zodiaque op. 70 – 1949, for Soloists, choir and 2 pianos
 Légendes op. 91 – 1956, for band
 Les bénédictions op. 48 – 1941, for Soloists, choir and piano
 Les bénédictions op. 48 – 1941, for Soloists, choir, large orchestra and organ
 Les chants du mort op. 55 – 1943, for mixed vocal quartet and orchestra
 Les chants du mort op. 55 – 1943, for mixed vocal quartet and piano – Soprano – Alto – Tenor – Bass
 Les météores op. 77 – 1951, for orchestra
 Les voix de la mer op. 75 – 1951, for opera
 Les voix de la mer op. 75 – 1951, for Soli, mixed choir speech choir and piano
 Les voix de la mer: Choeur aérien op. 75 – 1951, for women's choir
 Marines op. 36 – 1939, for piano
 Mythologie op. 84 – 1954, for large orchestra
 Nymphes et faunes op. 130 – 1966, for band
 Ouverture op. 75 – 1965, for opera
 Passacaille op. 101 – 1959, for piano
 Peau d'Ane op. 26 – 1937, for band
 Peau d'Ane op. 26 – 1937, for Soloists, speaking parts and orchestra
 Peau d'Ane op. 26 – 1937, for theatre music
 Peau d'Ane: Air de Peau d'Ane op. 26 – 1937, for Soprano and orchestra
 Peau d'Ane: Air de Peau d'Ane op. 26 – 1937, for Soprano and piano
 Peau d'Ane: Air du Prince op. 26 – 1937, for Tenor and orchestra
 Peau d'Ane: Air du Prince op. 26 – 1937, for Tenor and piano
 Peau d'Ane: Air du Roi op. 26 – 1937, for Bass and orchestra
 Peau d'Ane: Air du Roi op. 26 – 1937, for Bass and piano
 Peau d'Ane: Airs de ballet op. 26 – 1937, for chamber orchestra
 Peau d'Ane: Final du 3e acte op. 26 – 1937, for Soprano, Mezzo Soprano, Tenor, Bass and piano
 Peau d'Ane: Suite op. 26 – 1937, for chamber orchestra
 Petit bestiaire op. 151 – 1970, for guitar
 Petite suite op. 20 – 1935, for band
 Petite suite op. 20 – 1935, for chamber orchestra
 Petite suite op. 20 – 1935, for fanfare
 Petites polyphonies op. 128 – 1966, for 2 equal voices and piano
 Phantasmes – 1936, for Contralto, alto saxophone, percussion and piano
 Philatélie op. 46 – 1940, for mixed vocal quartet and 14 instruments
 Philatélie op. 46 – 1940, for Soprano, Mezzo Soprano, Tenor, Bass and piano
 Pièces caractéristiques op. 123 – 1964, for guitar
 Pièces en quatuor op. 35 – 1938, for saxophone quartet
 Pierre Breughel l'Ancien op. 73 – 1950, for Soloists, choir and piano
 Pierre Breughel l'Ancien op. 73 – 1950, for Soloists, mixed choir, speech choir, Narrator, large orchestra and organ
 Poésie et vélocité op. 157 – 1972, for piano
 Prélude et barcarolle – ?, for guitar
 Printemps op. 59 – 1944, for children's voices with piano accompaniment
 Quatre esquisses op. 154 – 1971, for flute, oboe, clarinet and bassoon
 Quatre pièces op. 150 – 1970, for guitar
 Quatre poèmes op. 12 – 1933, for middle voice and piano
 Quatuor à clavier op. 33 – 1938, for violin, viola, cello and piano
 Quatuor à cordes n°1 op. 5 – 1929, for 2 violins, viola and cello
 Quatuor à cordes n°2 op. 13 – 1934, for 2 violins, viola and cello
 Quatuor à cordes n°3 op. 19 – 1935, for 2 violins, viola and cello
 Quatuor à cordes n°4 op. 47 – 1941, for 2 violins, viola and cello
 Quatuor n°2 op. 28 – 1937, for cello quartet
 Quatuor op. 31 – 1937, for 4 saxophones
 Quatuor op. 132 – 1967, for 4 clarinets
 Quintette op. 16 – 1934, for flute, oboe, clarinet, horn and bassoon
 Rêves op. 80 – 1952, for middle voice and piano
 Rhapsodie brésilienne op. 81 – 1953, for band
 Rhapsodie brésilienne op. 81 – 1953, for orchestra
 Rhapsodie bulgare op. 104 – 1960, for orchestra
 Rhapsodie flamande op. 4 – 1928, for band
 Rhapsodie flamande op. 4 – 1928, for orchestra
 Rhapsodie n°2 op. 34 – 1938, for orchestra
 Rhapsodie n°5 op. 102 – 1959, for 2 pianos
 Rhapsodie n°5 op. 102 – 1959, for band
 Rhapsodie n°6 op. 120 – 1963, for horn and piano
 Rhapsodie roumaine op. 56 – 1943, for violin and orchestra
 Rhapsodie roumaine op. 56 – 1943, for violin and piano
 Rites op. 79 – 1952, for band
 Roumaniana op. 92 – 1956, for band
 Sicilienne – 1950, for flute or clarinet or saxophone and piano or harp
 Silhouettes op. 97 – 1958, for flute and piano
 Six choeurs I op. 18 – 1935, for children's choir and piano (1 voice)
 [divers], for
 Six choeurs II op. 18 – 1935, for two-part children's choir and piano
 Paul Fort, for
 Six poèmes de Maurice Carême op. 109 – 1961, for 3 equal voices
 Maurice Carême, for
 Sonate op. 115 – 1963, for alto saxophone and piano
 Sonate op. 134 – 1967, for violin
 Sonate op. 146 – 1970, for violin and piano
 Sonatine en duo op. 112 – 1962, for violin and viola
 Sonatine n°2 op. 37 – 1939, for piano
 Sonatine op. 27 – 1937, for piano
 Suite bucolique op. 95 – 1957, for string orchestra
 Suite mystique op. 145 – 1969, for flute quartet
 Suite n°2 op. 141 – 1968, for cello and piano
 Suite pastorale op. 37 – 1939, for flute, oboe, clarinet, horn and bassoon
 Suite pastorale op. 37 – 1939, for piano
 Suite sur des thèmes populaires roumains op. 90 – 1956, for saxophone quartet
 Suite op. 51 – 1942, for cello and piano
 Suite op. 78 – 1952, for trombone, tuba or cello and piano
 Suite op. 92 – 1956, for small orchestra
 Suite op. 114 – 1963, for guitar
 Suite op. 135 – 1967, for 2 guitars
 Suite op. 149 – 1970, for trumpet in C or B flat and piano
 Sur un paravent chinois op. 147 – 1970, for guitar
 Symphonie n°1 en ré mineur op. 1 – 1920, for orchestra
 Symphonie n°2 op. 25 – 1936, for large orchestra
 Symphonie n°3 op. 57 – 1943, for orchestra
 Symphonie n°4 op. 142 – 1969, for large orchestra
 Symphonie n°5 op. 148 – 1970, for large orchestra
 Tahi – Taho op. 8 – 1932, for middle voice and piano
 Thrène op. 66 – 1945, for two-part choir (equal voices), organ and 2 Narrators
 Trente études préparatoires à la polyrythmie op. 107 – 1961, for piano
 Trente études préparatoires à la polyrythmie op. 107 – 1961, for piano
 Trio à cordes n°1 op. 17 – 1935, for violin, viola, cello
 Trio à cordes n°2 op. 39 – 1939, for violin, viola, cello
 Trio n°2 op. 158 – 1972, for violin, cello and piano
 Trio op. 7 – 1931, for violin, cello and piano
 Triptyque op. 106 – 1960, for small orchestra
 Trois choeurs op. 15 – 1934, for 4 men's voices a cappella
 Trois impromptus op. 10 – 1932, for piano
 Trois pièces op. 32 – 1938, for piano
 Trois pièces op. 32 – 1938, for piano (right hand)
 Trois pièces op. 119 – 1963, for 2 guitars
 Trois pièces op. 121 – 1964, for bandoneon
 Trois Pièces op. 127 – 1965, for organ
 Trois poèmes d'Arthur Cantillon op. 9 – 1932, for 4 unaccompanied mixed voices
 Trois poèmes de Tristan Klingsor op. 45 – 1940, for middle voice and piano
 Trois poèmes de Tristan Klingsor op. 45 – 1940, for middle voice and small orchestra
 Trois vocalises op. 116 – 1963, for middle voice and piano
 Ulysse et les Sirènes op. 41 – 1939, for 1 Bar., 2 Narr., men's choir, women's choir and piano
 Ulysse et les Sirènes op. 41 – 1939, for Soloists (1 Bar., 2 Narrators), men's choir, women's choir and small orchestra
 Variations symphoniques op. 50 – 1942, for large orchestra
 Variations op. 93 – 1956, for piano
 Zoo op. 63 – 1944, for vocal quartet a cappella

References
 Koninklijk Conservatorium Brussel now houses most works and manuscripts of Absil, after the bankruptcy of CeBeDeM in 2015.

1893 births
1974 deaths
20th-century classical composers
Belgian classical composers
Belgian male classical composers
Composers for the classical guitar
Belgian opera composers
Male opera composers
People from Péruwelz
Prix de Rome (Belgium) winners
Academic staff of the Royal Conservatory of Brussels
Walloon people
Members of the Royal Academy of Belgium
20th-century Belgian male musicians